Following are the results of the 2010 Comerica Bank Challenger singles.  The 2010 Comerica Bank Challenger was a professional tennis tournament played on hard court. This was the twenty-third edition of the tournament which is part of the 2010 ATP Challenger Tour. It took place in Aptos, United States between 12 July and 18 July 2010.

Chris Guccione was the defending champion, but he lost to Izak van der Merwe in the first round.Marinko Matosevic won the tournament after he defeated Donald Young in the final 6–4, 6–2.

Seeds

  Rajeev Ram (first round)
  Somdev Devvarman (semifinals)
  Donald Young (final)
  Carsten Ball (semifinals)
  Ilija Bozoljac (quarterfinals)
  Kevin Kim (first round)
  Alex Bogdanovic (quarterfinals)
  Tim Smyczek (first round)

Draw

Finals

Top half

Bottom half

References
Main Draw
Qualifying Singles

Comerica Bank Challenger - Singles
Nordic Naturals Challenger